Pandora A/S (often styled PANDORA) is a Danish jewellery manufacturer and retailer founded in 1982 by Per Enevoldsen. The company started as a family-run jewellery shop in Copenhagen.

Pandora is known for its customizable charm bracelets, designer rings, earrings, necklaces and (now discontinued) watches. The company has two production sites in Thailand and markets its products in more than 100 countries on six continents with more than 6,700 points of sale.

History

Pandora was founded in 1982 by Danish goldsmith Per Enevoldsen and, his then-wife, Winnie Enevoldsen. The pair began on a small scale by importing jewellery from Thailand and selling to consumers. 

In 1987, the company ended its retail operations and became a pure wholesaler; two years later Enevoldsen hired in-house designers and established a manufacturing site in Thailand, where it is still located. With low production costs and an efficient supply chain, the Enevoldsens could provide affordable, hand-finished jewellery for the mass market. Pandora's collection grew to include an assortment of rings, necklaces, earrings and watches.  It started selling its signature charm bracelets in 2000 after several years of development, protected by a patent.

The Danish private equity group Axcel bought a 60% stake in the company from the Enevoldsen family in 2008. The company is publicly listed on the NASDAQ OMX Copenhagen Stock Exchange in Denmark and is a component of the OMX Copenhagen 20 index.

Pandora became the world's third-largest jewellery company in terms of sales, after Cartier and Tiffany & Co. In 2011, more than one piece of Pandora jewellery was sold every second on average.

Shares fell nearly 80% in 2011 after a shift in focus to higher-end designs alienated core customers, but performance recovered after a return to the more affordable mass market, with the group reporting revenue of DKK 19 billion and net profit in excess of DKK 3 billion in 2014. In 2020 and due to the Covid-19 pandemic, 80% of Pandora's 2,700 stores around the world were closed. However, the company kept paying to all its staff in full, even for those who used to work in the closed stores.

In early May 2021, Pandora announced the company would phase out mined diamonds in favour of gems manufactured in a laboratory. The new diamond jewellery was first sold in the United Kingdom before being sold globally in 2022.

Pandora is one of the world's largest jewellery brands with 19 billion Danish kroner in revenue and a retail network of around 2,700 stores.

Distribution network
Sales of the Pandora brand began in Europe and it first entered North America in 2003. The company opened concept stores around the world before its franchising model began in Australia in 2009.
Pandora products are sold in more than 100 countries on six continents through approximately 6,700 points of sale, including approximately 2,400 concept stores. The company employs over 26,000 people, of whom 13,200 are located in Gemopolis, Thailand, the company's sole manufacturing site since 1989.

Pandora launched an online sales platform in Europe in 2011, and began working to expand its e-commerce to the majority of its markets including Australia.

Europe and the United States accounted for nearly 90% of group sales in 2014. The group announced a Chinese distribution deal in 2015, with plans to increase store numbers to "a couple of hundred" in China. In 2015, it bought out Oracle Investment's shares in its Chinese distribution service.

References

External links

 

2010 initial public offerings
Bracelets
Clothing companies established in 1982
Companies based in Copenhagen
Companies listed on Nasdaq Copenhagen
Danish brands
Danish companies established in 1982
Jewellery retailers
Companies based in Copenhagen Municipality